Nieni is a chiefdom in Koinadugu District of Sierra Leone with a population of 39,107. Its principal town is Yiffin.

References

Chiefdoms of Sierra Leone
Northern Province, Sierra Leone